Abrothrix is a genus of rodent in the tribe Abrotrichini of family Cricetidae.
It contains the following living species:
Abrothrix andina
Abrothrix hershkovitzi
Abrothrix hirta
Abrothrix illutea
Abrothrix jelskii
Abrothrix lanosa
Abrothrix longipilis
Abrothrix manni 
Abrothrix olivacea
Abrothrix sanborni
Abrothrix xanthorhina

Footnotes

References

Literature cited
MUSSER, G. G. AND M. D. CARLETON. 2005. Superfamily Muroidea. Pp. 894–1531 in Mammal species of the world: a taxonomic and geographic reference, 3rd ed (Wilson DE and Reeder DAM eds.), Johns Hopkins University Press, Baltimore.
D'Elía, G., Pardiñas, U.F.J., Teta, P. and Patton, J.L. 2007. Definition and diagnosis of a new tribe of sigmodontine rodents (Cricetidae: Sigmodontinae), and a revised classification of the subfamily. Gayana 71(2):187–194.
TETA, P., C. CAÑÓN, B. D. PATTERSON, AND U. F. J. PARDIÑAS. 2017. Phylogeny of the tribe Abrotrichini (Cricetidae, Sigmodontinae): integrating morphological and molecular evidence into a new classification. Cladistics 33(2):153–182.
Rodríguez-Serrano, E., Hernández, C.E. and Palma, R.E. 2008. A new record and an evaluation of the phylogenetic relationships of Abrothrix olivaceus markhami (Rodentia: Sigmodontinae). Mammalian Biology 73(4):309–317.

 
Taxonomy articles created by Polbot